East Tyrone was a UK parliamentary constituency in Ireland. It returned one Member of Parliament (MP) to the British House of Commons from 1885 to 1918.

Prior to the 1885 United Kingdom general election the area was part of the Tyrone constituency. From the dissolution of Parliament in 1918 East Tyrone became part of the new North East Tyrone constituency.

Boundaries
This constituency comprised the eastern part of County Tyrone, consisting of the barony of Dungannon Upper and that part of the barony of Dungannon Middle not contained within the constituency of South Tyrone.

Members of Parliament

Elections

Elections in the 1880s

Elections in the 1890s

Elections in the 1900s

Elections in the 1910s

References

Sydney Morning Herald, 28 July 1906
The Constitutional Year Book, 1919 (London: National Union of Conservative and Unionist Associations, 1919)

East Tyrone
Constituencies of the Parliament of the United Kingdom established in 1885
Constituencies of the Parliament of the United Kingdom disestablished in 1918